Cartoon Network Universe: FusionFall was a massively multiplayer online game developed by Cartoon Network and South Korean studio Grigon Entertainment and released on January 14, 2009. FusionFall used the Unity engine as its client technology basis.

For the first year, the full game required a subscription; free accounts could only access a portion of the content. On August 29, 2013, the game's servers were shut down. It was unofficially revived by fans as two different games in 2017, the first being FusionFall: Retro which was the original game and the second being FusionFall: Legacy which was planned to be the original game but with additional content. On April 15, 2020, Cartoon Network issued a DMCA takedown notice to the developers of the games, resulting in Retro being removed entirely and Legacy's cancellation. The developers also issued a statement regarding the DMCA takedown saying that they respected the decision made by Cartoon Network.

Plot 
Under the control of Lord Fuse, Planet Fusion travels through the universe. He is destroying planets by devouring them, and Earth becomes the next target. To do so, he drops Fusion Matter that takes a warped monster-like shape of objects nearby. The goal is to prevent the enemies' plan and defeat them.

Gameplay 
In FusionFall, the player takes control of a customized character. The game featured more than 50 characters and several areas based on current and past shows of Cartoon Network. A part of the roster is made of companions that will assist during the adventure.

The character is viewed from a third-person perspective with an overlaid HUD. By defeating the enemies, the players level up and receive the currency for buying clothing and weapon upgrades. There are two types of attacks in combat that can be switched by a button press: ranged and melee. A special feature present in FusionFall is the use of nanos, representing small avatars that provide abilities for a short time. A nano can be attained by defeating an evil doppelganger, with a choice of one out of three abilities to be provided.

There are four characters available as a Guide, which were Ben Tennyson, Dexter, Edd, and Mojo Jojo. They give rewards like equipment and items for completing certain quests.

Playing past Level Five originally required a monthly paid subscription in the form of redeemable cards that could be purchased at participating retailers. The cards were rendered obsolete after April 16, 2010, when the entirety of the game became free to play; players with unredeemed time cards were offered a refund for their unused cards. Since the game was designed for kids primarily, there were parental control options. That gave parents a monitoring ability to watch what their children were doing and restrict how much the account can chat with other users.

In-game events 
On certain holidays, such as Thanksgiving or Christmas, FusionFall had small in-game celebrations that usually involved a special code for exclusive holiday items, scenery, and missions carried by special guest appearances of future cast members. Events for holidays stretched from two weeks to several months; some rolled directly from one to the other. The game periodically added new missions, NPC's, areas, and elements from more recent shows. An area called the Academy was also put into the game, where players made their characters and started playing. FusionFall'''s development, however, stopped so Cartoon Network could focus on other games such as Project Exonaut, Formula Cartoon, and FusionFall Heroes. The Holo Suit, an in-game outfit, used to change look, reflecting in-game events and the time of year.

 Development 
After trying for four years to get the project up, the development started in April 2006. Turner Entertainment wanted to take time to plan the business model carefully while searching for a developer at the same time. They settled on a Korean studio Grigon Entertainment, due to their art style and sense of humor. Some characters were aged up in order to please a wide range of the target audience. Unity was decided to be the engine running the game, as the team wanted for people to play even on low-end computers. To be easier for the younger players to access the game, it was made to be played in a web-browser.

A comic prequel, co-written by Matthew Schwartz and Megas XLR co-creator George Krstic, entitled FusionFall: Worlds Collide!!, was passed out during Comic Con '07. The comic used to be available on the official website for public viewing and in PDF format for download. It covers the events leading up to the start of the game.

Open beta testing began on November 14, 2008, available to anyone with an account on Cartoon Network's website. It ended on November 16, 2008. A second beta began on December 5, 2008, and ended on December 7, 2008. The third took place during the weekend of December 12, 2008, with a single-day extension on December 19. A final beta test started on December 27, 2008, and ran until January 11, 2009. All characters created before December 22, 2008, including those of the FusionFall staff, were deleted, but all made on or after December 27, 2008, were carried onto the official release.

 Release 
When it was first released, FusionFall required a paid subscription for the full game, with a limited portion of the content available for free. Free accounts could only play in the "future" portion of the game, which only allows players to collect four nanos and create two characters. The full game had a total of 40 nanos, 36 before the new extensions. To create up to four characters, players had to earn all 36 nanos during the beta testing. Players with characters that progressed into the past during the sneak peek or during a previous subscription had their characters locked until a current subscription was purchased.

Subscription plans included one-month, three-month, year-long, and family plans. The FusionFall Victory Pack Exclusive was made available for purchase when the game was released. It contained a four-month subscription, as well as a game guide, T-shirt (if bought from GameStop), and exclusive outfits and weapons for the player's character. The Victory Packs were eventually discontinued, having been replaced with one-month and three-month game card available for purchase at Target outlets.

The game was made completely free on April 19, 2010, making everything a member could have available for free.

 Reception 

 FusionFall Heroes 
On March 25, 2013, about five months before the original game's shutdown, Cartoon Network released a new FusionFall game called FusionFall Heroes. In this game, instead of playing an avatar players created online, Cartoon Network decided to let online players actually play different variants of their favorite Cartoon Network characters. The game takes place concurrently with Fuse's attack on the Cartoon Network Universe in the original game. Playable characters include Finn the Human, Fionna the Human, and Marceline of Adventure Time, Dexter of Dexter's Laboratory, Mordecai and Rigby of Regular Show, Four Arms and Feedback of Ben 10, Gumball Watterson of The Amazing World of Gumball, Mojo Jojo of The Powerpuff Girls'', and Johnny Bravo of his eponymous show. In the game, there are different costumes for player characters, as well as eggs that can unlock new costumes for different heroes.

References

External links 
 

Massively multiplayer online role-playing games
2009 video games
Browser-based multiplayer online games
Cartoon Network video games
Crossover role-playing video games
Inactive massively multiplayer online games
Science fantasy video games
MacOS games
Windows games
Products and services discontinued in 2013
Video games developed in South Korea